Vladimir Mikhailovich Petlyakov (15 June 1891 – 12 January 1942) was a Soviet aeronautical engineer and aircraft designer.

Petlyakov was born in 1891 in Sambek (Don Host Oblast, Russian Empire) (currently part of Neklinovsky District, Rostov Oblast), where his father served as a local official. After graduating from the Technical College in Taganrog (today the "Taganrog Petlyakov Aviation College", Таганрогский авиационный колледж им. В. М. Петлякова) in 1910. he travelled to Moscow, where he was accepted into the Moscow State Technical University; however, due to financial difficulties he was unable to complete his studies. After the 1917 Russian Revolution he continued his education and was hired to work as a technician in the aerodynamics laboratory at Moscow State Technical University under the guidance of Nikolai Zhukovsky, while resuming his studies. He gained experience as a laboratory assistant on wind tunnels and on calculations for aircraft design. In 1922 he graduated from the same university.

From 1921 to 1936 Petlyakov worked at the Central Aerohydrodynamic Institute (TsAGI)under the guidance of Andrei Tupolev; there he became involved in wing design and in the development of gliders. In 1936 he became a chief aircraft-designer at an aviation plant. Petlyakov was directly involved in the organization and development of Soviet metal aircraft construction. In particular, Petlyakov (together with the engineer Nikolai Belyaev) elaborated methods of calculating durability of materials and theory on designing metal wings with multiple spars. Petlyakov assisted in designing the first Soviet heavy bombers TB-1, TB-3 (1930–1935), and a long-range high-altitude four-engine bomber, the Pe-8 (1935–1937).

On 21 October 1937, Petlyakov, together with Tupolev and the entire directorate of the TsAGI, was arrested on trumped-up charges of sabotage, espionage and of aiding the Russian Fascist Party. Many of his colleagues were executed. In 1939 he was moved from a prison to an NKVD sharashka for aircraft designers near Moscow, where many ex-TsAGI people had already been sent to work. Petlyakov was given the task of designing a high-altitude fighter, which he successfully accomplished. Operational experience in the Soviet-Finnish War of 1939–1940 showed that this was not what the Soviet Air Force needed, and Lavrentiy Beria, head of the NKVD and of the sharashka system, ordered that the fighter be redesigned as a dive bomber, with the promise that Petlyakov and his colleagues would be released on its successful completion.

The resulting aircraft, the Pe-2, which went into serial production at the Kazan Aviation Plant, proved to be one of the most successful designs of World War II. Petlyakov was released in 1940, and was awarded a Stalin Prize in 1941. At Kazan, Petlyakov faced increasing difficulties, with many of his trained technicians and machinists conscripted into the Soviet military and sent to the front lines, which adversely affected the quality of production aircraft. He protested to Soviet senior leadership, and was on his way to Moscow in January 1942 (flying in a Pe-2), when he died  in an air crash near Arzamas. His grave is at the Arskoe Cemetery in Kazan.

Vladimir Petlyakov received the Stalin prize (1941) and was awarded two Orders of Lenin and an Order of the Red Star.

References

1891 births
1942 deaths
People from Rostov Oblast
People from Don Host Oblast
Soviet aerospace engineers
Bauman Moscow State Technical University alumni
Sharashka inmates
Stalin Prize winners
Soviet rehabilitations
Burials at Arskoe Cemetery
Victims of aviation accidents or incidents in 1942
Victims of aviation accidents or incidents in the Soviet Union